Melchiorre or Melchior Zoppio (c. 1544–1634) was an Italian doctor and scholar.

Life
Born in Bologna, a son of Girolamo Zoppio, Melchiorre Zoppio followed his father's dual career in medicine and education. He taught philosophy in Macerata then Bologna, where in 1588 he was one of the founders of the Academia di Gelati. He was one of that society's keenest members, adopting the name Caliginoso within it and leaving it a room for its meetings in his will. Over the fifty years he served as a professor in Bologna Melchiorre acquired such a reputation that his colleagues honoured him with a public inscription during his lifetime. His funeral involved an elaborate procession to the Basilica di Santa Maria dei Servi, where he was buried, and a eulogy by his colleague André Torelli.

Works
Among many treatises on scholastic philosophy and some pamphlets, whose titles can be found in the Scrittori bolognesi by Orlandi, Melchior also wrote two comedies and four tragedies. The comedies were Diogene accusato (Venice, 1598, in-12), written in verses of five, seven and nine syllables, and Il Giuliano, whilst the tragedies were Admeto, Medea, Creusa and Meandro (all Bologna, 1629, in-12). He also left behind many works in manuscript form, including six large folio volumes on philosophical matters. Ghilini called Melchior a microcosm of sciences and letters and gave him and his father pieces in his Teatro d'uomini letterati.

References

  "Melchiorre Zoppio", in Louis-Gabriel Michaud, Biographie universelle ancienne et moderne : histoire par ordre alphabétique de la vie publique et privée de tous les hommes avec la collaboration de plus de 300 savants et littérateurs français ou étrangers, 2nd edition, 1843–1865
 

1544 births
1634 deaths
16th-century Italian physicians
17th-century Italian physicians
Italian dramatists and playwrights
Academic staff of the University of Macerata
Italian philosophers
Physicians from Bologna